Jean (or Janet) Clouet (1480–1541) was a miniaturist and painter who worked in France during the High Renaissance.  He was the father of François Clouet.

Biography

The authentic presence of this artist at the French court is first mentioned in 1516, the second year of the reign of Francis I. By a deed of gift made by the king to the artist's son of his father's estate, which had escheated to the crown, we learn that he was not actually a Frenchman, and never naturalized.  He is supposed to have been a native of the Low Countries, and probably his real name was Cloet. He lived several years in Tours, and there it was he met his wife, who was the daughter of a jeweller.

He is recorded as living in Tours in 1522, and there is a reference to his wife's residence in the same town in 1523. In that year Clouet was awarded the position of Groom of the Chamber by the King, with a stipend at first of 180 livres and later of 240. He and his wife were certainly living in Paris in 1529, probably in the neighborhood of the parish of Ste Innocente, in the cemetery of which they were buried. He stood godfather at a christening on 8 July 1540, but was no longer living in December 1541.

His brother, known as Clouet de Navarre, was in the service of Marguerite d'Angoulême, sister of Francis I, and is referred to in a letter written by Marguerite about 1529. Jean Clouet had two children, François and Catherine, who married Abel Foulon, and left one son, who continued the profession of François Clouet after his decease.

Jean Clouet was undoubtedly a very skillful portrait painter, although no work in existence has been proved to be his. He painted a portrait of the mathematician Oronce Finé in 1530, when Fine was thirty-six years old, but the portrait is now known only by a print. Janet is generally believed, however, to have been responsible for a very large number of the wonderful portrait drawings now preserved at Chantilly, and at the Bibliothèque Nationale, and to him is attributed the portrait of an unknown man at Hampton Court, that of the dauphin Francis, son of Francis I at Antwerp, and one other portrait, that of Francis I in the Louvre.

Seven miniature portraits in the Manuscript of the Gallic War in the Bibliothèque Nationale (13,429) are attributed to Janet with very strong probability, and to these may be added an eighth in the collection of J. Pierpont Morgan, and representing Charles I de Cossé, Maréchal de Brissac, identical in its characteristics with the seven already known. There are other miniatures in the collection of Mr Morgan, which may be attributed to Jean Clouet with some strong degree of probability, inasmuch as they closely resemble the portrait drawings at Chantilly and in Paris which are taken to be his work.

The collection of drawings preserved in France, and attributed to this artist and his school, comprises portraits of all the important persons of the time of Francis I. In one album of drawings the portraits are annotated by the king himself, and his merry reflections, stinging taunts or biting satires, add very largely to a proper understanding of the life of his time and court. Definite evidence, however, is still lacking to establish the attribution of the best of these drawings and of certain oil paintings to Jean Clouet.

Notes

References

 Cécile Scailliérez Francis I by Clouet, meeting des Musées Nationaux, 1996
 Dictionary Bénézit critic and documentary dictionary of painters, sculptors, designers and writers of all times and all countries, vol. 3 January 1999, p 13440., p. 725
 Oxford Dictionary edited by Robert Maillard, Universal Dictionary of painting, vol. 2 Smeets Offset BV Weert (Netherlands), October 1975, p 3000., p. 42-43
 (en) Peter Mellen, Jean Clouet, complete edition of the drawings, miniatures and paintings, London, New York, Phaidon Press, 1971, 262 p.
 Peter Mellen (trans. Anne Roullet), Jean Clouet, Catalogue raisonné of the drawings, miniatures and paintings, Paris, Flammarion, 1971, p. 250 
 Lawrence Gowing (Pref. Michel Laclotte) The paintings in the Louvre, Paris Editions Nathan, 1988, 686 p., p. 204

External links

Francis I  Monumentality and miniature at Jean Clouet

1480 births
1541 deaths
French portrait painters
Portrait miniaturists
Early Netherlandish painters
15th-century French painters
French male painters
16th-century French painters
French Renaissance painters
Artists from Brussels